La ragazza dal pigiama giallo (Italian for The Girl in the Yellow Pyjamas) is a 1977 Italian giallo film directed by Flavio Mogherini, distributed internationally as The Pyjama Girl Case.

Film information 
The film is based on a real story, the "Pyjama Girl" case, one of Australia's most well known unsolved murders. It was filmed in Australia and produced by studio Zodiac Produzioni, in co-operation with Producciones Internacionales Cinematográficas Asociadas (PICASA).

The soundtrack album La ragazza dal pigiama giallo was released in Italy in 1978, and consisted of the instrumental score by composer Riz Ortolani as well as two songs with vocals by Amanda Lear: the theme tune "Your Yellow Pyjama" and "Look at Her Dancing".

Synopsis 
The film consists of two parallel narratives. One tells about an investigation of a murder of a girl whose severely burned body has been found on a beach in Sydney. The police have a suspect in the murder, but the retired inspector Thompson is convinced they are wrong and continues his own investigation. The second is a story of a young Dutch girl Glenda and her partner, an Italian Antonio. Although they are in a relationship, Glenda keeps seeing other men.

Cast 
 Ray Milland as Inspector Thompson
 Dalila Di Lazzaro as  Glenda Blythe
 Michele Placido as  Antonio Attolini
 Mel Ferrer as  Professor Henry Douglas
 Howard Ross as  Roy Conner
 Ramiro Oliveros as  Inspector  Ramsey
 Rod Mullinar as  Inspector Morris
 Giacomo Assandri as  Quint
 Eugene Walter as Dorsey
 Fernando Fernán Gómez

References

External links 
 

1977 films
Crime films based on actual events
Giallo films
1970s Italian-language films
English-language Italian films
Films directed by Flavio Mogherini
Films scored by Riz Ortolani
Films set in Australia
Italian erotic horror films
1970s Italian films